The 2015 Sun Belt Conference men's basketball tournament was held in New Orleans, Louisiana from March 12 to March 15 at Lakefront Arena. The tournament winner received an automatic bid into the 2015 NCAA tournament. Opening round games were televised on ESPN3, with the championship game on ESPN2, on Sunday March 15.

Seeds
Only the top eight teams advanced to the Sun Belt Conference tournament. If a team ineligible for the NCAA Tournament should finish in the top eight, its seed would fall to the next eligible team.  Teams were seeded based on conference record with a tie breaker system used to separate teams who are tied. The top two seeds received a double bye, and the third and fourth seeds received a single bye.

Schedule

Bracket

References

External links
 2015 Sun Belt Men's Basketball Championship

Sun Belt Conference men's basketball tournament
Tournament
Sun Belt Conference men's basketball tournament
Sun Belt Conference men's basketball tournament